"Information display systems" (IDS) is the general designation for the control panels and displays of Russian (and previous Soviet) spacecraft. For example, the original Soyuz 7K-OK spacecraft used the "Sirius-7k" IDS.

See also
Voskhod Spacecraft Globus IMP navigation instrument

References
Information Display Systems for Russian Spacecraft: An Overview

Soviet computer systems
Science and technology in Russia
Space program of Russia
Space program of the Soviet Union